Joseph Fitzgerald Hamilton (born March 13, 1977) is a former American college and professional football player who was a quarterback in three different professional leagues.  He played college football for the Georgia Institute of Technology, earned All-American recognition and won several national awards. After his playing career ended, Hamilton became an administrator and coach.  He has served as the running backs coach for Georgia State University and currently works in the recruiting department for his alma mater, Georgia Tech.

College career
Hamilton accepted an athletic scholarship to attend Georgia Tech, where he played for the Georgia Tech Yellow Jackets football team from 1996 to 1999.  He set Atlantic Coast Conference (ACC) career records for total offense (10,640 yards), touchdown passes (65) and total touchdowns (83).  As a senior in 1999, he was recognized as a consensus first-team All-American, won the Davey O'Brien Award, and was a finalist for the Heisman Trophy, finishing as the runner-up in the Heisman voting behind Wisconsin running back Ron Dayne.  In 2002, he was named as one of the fifty members of the ACC 50th Anniversary Football Team. Hamilton was elected to the College Football Hall of Fame in 2014.

Professional career
Due to his lack of prototypical height for an NFL quarterback (standing just 5'10"/1.78 m), he fell to the 7th round of the 2000 NFL Draft before being drafted by the Tampa Bay Buccaneers. In three years with the Buccaneers he only played four downs in a single regular-season game.  In 2002, the Buccaneers allocated Hamilton to NFL Europe, where he led the Frankfurt Galaxy to 5-2 record in 2002 before suffering a torn ACL.  He spent the entire 2002 NFL season on injured reserve and was released by the Buccaneers at the end of the season.   He received a Super Bowl ring following the Buccaneers' victory in Super Bowl XXXVII.

He signed with the Arena Football League's Orlando Predators in 2004 and guided the team to a 9-5 record and the playoffs, despite suffering another knee injury and missing two and a half games.

He was then signed by the Indianapolis Colts in 2004, reuniting with former Buccaneers coach Tony Dungy, but only saw limited action in one game before being released during the season.

He returned to the Orlando Predators where he was the starting quarterback through the 2006 season.  He has a 32-15 record as the Predators' starter and led them to ArenaBowl XX in 2006, losing 69-61 to the Chicago Rush.  With a win, Hamilton would have become the first player in history to own both a Super Bowl and ArenaBowl ring. In the 2006 off-season, he was released by the Orlando Predators.

Post-playing career
He returned to school, and received his degree in History, Technology, and Society in August 2007. "

In 2008, following an arrest for a hit and run, DUI, open container and marijuana possession, Joe Hamilton resigned as a Georgia Tech assistant coach—less than two weeks after he was hired.

In 2010, he resurrected his coaching career when he became a recruiting intern at Georgia State, which had launched its Georgia State Panthers football team that year. In June 2011, he joined the Panthers' full-time staff as running backs coach. On May 7, 2013, exactly 5 years after submitting his resignation, Hamilton was re-hired by Georgia Tech to provide assistance with recruiting for the Yellow Jackets football team.

Currently, Hamilton is the co-host of The Locker Room, a morning sports radio program on WCNN in Atlanta and he is the color analyst for Georgia Tech football radio broadcasts

Collegiate awards and honors
 1996 – Four ACC Rookie of the Week Awards, Runner-up ACC Rookie of the Year
 1997 – Two ACC Offensive Back of the Week Awards, Georgia Tech MVP for the Year, MVP of 1997 Carquest Bowl vs West Virginia
 1998 – One ACC Offensive Back of the Week Award, 1st Team All-ACC Quarterback, Co-MVP of 1999 Gator Bowl against Notre Dame, led the team to ending 7 year losing streak to the Georgia
 1999 – Davey O'Brien Award winner, Runner-up to the 1999 Heisman Trophy, 1st Team All-America Quarterback, 1st Team All-ACC Quarterback, Three ACC Offensive Back of the Week Awards, defeated University of Georgia 51-48 for second straight year in wild overtime victory
 2000 – Anthony J. McKelvin Award, ACC Male Athlete of the Year
 2002 – ACC 50th Anniversary Football Team
 2005 – ACC Football Legends - Inaugural Class
 2007 – Received degree from Georgia Tech in History, Technology and Society
 2014 – Inducted into the College Football Hall of Fame

See also
 List of Arena Football League and National Football League players
 List of Georgia Tech Yellow Jackets starting quarterbacks
 Georgia Tech Yellow Jackets football statistical leaders

References

External links

 Georgia State profile
 Georgia Tech profile

1977 births
Living people
African-American coaches of American football
All-American college football players
American football quarterbacks
College Football Hall of Fame inductees
Frankfurt Galaxy players
Georgia State Panthers football coaches
Georgia Tech Yellow Jackets football players
Indianapolis Colts players
Orlando Predators players
People from Berkeley County, South Carolina
Tampa Bay Buccaneers players
21st-century African-American sportspeople
20th-century African-American sportspeople